Christopher Kas and Oliver Marach were the defending champion, but decided not to compete.

Marc Gicquel and Sergiy Stakhovsky won the title when Ryan Harrison and Alex Kuznetsov withdrew.

Seeds

  Marin Draganja /  Florin Mergea (quarterfinals)
  Ken Skupski /  Neal Skupski (first round)
  Dominik Meffert /  Philipp Oswald (quarterfinals)
  Mateusz Kowalczyk /  Andreas Siljeström (first round)

Draw

Draw

External Links
 Main Draw

BNP Paribas Primrose Bordeauxandnbsp;- Doubles
2014 Doubles